Oscroft is a surname. Notable people include:

 Eric Oscroft (born 1933), English cricketer
 Harry Oscroft (1926-2008), English footballer
 John Oscroft (cricketer, born 1807) (1807–1857), English cricketer
 John Oscroft (cricketer, born 1846) (1846–1885), English cricketer
 Percy Oscroft (1872-1933), English cricketer
 William Oscroft (1843-1905), English cricketer